Arkholme-with-Cawood is a civil parish of the City of Lancaster in Lancashire, England.  The parish of Arkholme-with-Cawood had a population of 334 recorded in the  2001 census, falling marginally to 333 at the 2011 Census. The parish is north east of Lancaster and lies on the B6254 road.

History
Arkholme is a small village forming part of a cluster of sites along the Lune Valley, each with evidence of a motte – as with Melling and Whittington. Arkholme has no surviving bailey. This is the densest distribution of Norman castles outside of the Welsh border countryside.

It was served by the Furness and Midland Joint Railway line, until 1960. A tunnel took the line from Wennington (where it connected with the Midland Railway) to Melling, the next station being at Arkholme.

Thankful Village
Arkholme is one of only two Thankful Villages in Lancashire – those rare places that suffered no fatalities during the Great War of 1914 to 1918. This small village sent by far the largest number from one village and parish off to war – 59. It is remarkable that all 59 returned to their homes. A nearby village, Nether Kellet, 5 miles to the south west, sent 21 men and it, too, is a Thankful Village – all their men returned.

According to an article on the BBC website, Arkholme and Nether Kellet were also doubly Thankful Villages, having lost no men in either world war.

Arkholme Village Hall, designed by Mason Gillibrand Architects of Caton, Lancaster, was completed in 2004 and won an RICS Community Benefit Award in 2005.

Cawood
Cawood was originally the forest owned by the Lords of Hornby, hence the "wood" in its name.

Broadband

Arkholme was the one of the first places connected to the Broadband 4 Rural North high speed broadband network.

See also
Listed buildings in Arkholme-with-Cawood

References

External links
 
 
 Village Website

Civil parishes in Lancashire
Geography of the City of Lancaster